Mediolanum Santonum was a Roman town in Gallia Aquitania, now Saintes. It was founded in about 20 BC in connection with an expansion of the network of Roman roads serving Burdigala. The name means 'centre of the Santones', the tribe that then inhabited the area; the town became an important center in the Roman province of Gallia Aquitania.

Monuments
The principal extant monuments of the Roman period are:
a Roman city gate now called the Arch of Germanicus
a fairly large Roman lapidary collection
a large amphitheatre

Gallery

References

Bibliography

20s BC establishments in the Roman Empire
Populated places established in the 1st century BC
Roman towns and cities in France
Santones
Gallia Aquitania
Saintes, Charente-Maritime